Hauschild is a surname. Notable people with the surname include:

Jürgen Hauschild, German canoeist
Mike Hauschild (born 1990), American baseball pitcher
Winston Hauschild (born 1973), Canadian record producer and songwriter

See also
George H. Hauschild Building, building in Victoria, Texas
Hauschildt

German-language surnames